Elections to the City of Melbourne were held via postal ballot in October 2020 to elect 9 councillors to the council, as well as the direct election of the Lord Mayor and Deputy Lord Mayor of Melbourne. The incumbent Lord Mayor, Sally Capp, who was first elected in a 2018 by-election, won a second term defeating incumbent Deputy Lord Mayor Arron Wood.

Results

Leadership Team election

Councillor election

Key dates
Key dates in relation to the election are:
 Thursday, 28 August 2020 – Close of electoral rolls (4pm)
 Tuesday, 22 September 2020 – Close of nominations (12 noon)
 Tuesday, 6 October 2020 – Mail out of postal ballots commences
 Friday, 23 October 2020 – Close of voting (6pm)
 Friday, 30 October 2020 – Last day for receipt of postal votes (12 noon)
 Friday, 13 November 2020 – Declaration of result

Candidates
A total of 77 candidates nominated for the election, an increase of 19 from the 2016 election. There are 18 candidates for the Leadership Team positions of Lord Mayor and Deputy Lord Mayor running on 9 tickets, up from 14 candidates on 7 tickets in 2016. 59 candidates have nominated for councillor positions, up from 44 in 2016.

Leadership Team
Incumbent Lord Mayor and Deputy Lord Mayor are shown in bold text. Successful candidates are highlighted in the relevant colour.

Councillors
Sitting members are shown in bold text. Tickets that elected at least one councillor are highlighted in the relevant colour. Successful candidates are identified by an asterisk (*).

References

External links

 Melbourne City Council elections – Victorian Electoral Commission
 Melbourne City Council elections – City of Melbourne

 2020
2020 elections in Australia
2020s in Melbourne